Llewellyn is an unincorporated community in Branch Township, Schuylkill County, Pennsylvania, United States. The community is located approximately 1.5 miles southwest of Minersville, along the West Branch of the Schuylkill River.

References

Unincorporated communities in Schuylkill County, Pennsylvania
Coal towns in Pennsylvania
Unincorporated communities in Pennsylvania